Duren Sawit is a village (kelurahan) of Duren Sawit, East Jakarta, Indonesia. The village is also the seat of administration of the Duren Sawit district. It has a population of just under 70,000 in 2016, making it the fourth most populated village in the district.

It was previously part of the Jatinegara district until 1990, when a presidential decree created the Duren Sawit district.

References

Villages of Duren Sawit

su:Durén Sawit, Jakarta Timur